Karl Josef Maximilian of Limburg Stirum, count of Limburg Styrum, sovereign lord zu Gemen, was the son of Alois of Limburg Stirum.

He inherited the immediate lordship of Gemen from his uncle Ferdinand I of Limburg Stirum in 1791 and remained until his death in 1798. Alois having survived his three sons, Gemen passed to his grandson Ferdinand IV of Limburg Stirum.

He married Maria Anna Vogel von Wassenhofen and they had five children:	

 Johann Nepomuck, count of Limburg Stirum (born 1756, died 1791);
 Joseph (born 1757, died 1766);
 Franz, born in 1760;
 Johann Nepomuck (?) (born 1766, died 1787);
 Anna Maria, born in 1750;
 Maria Barbara (born 1762, died 1769).

Year of birth missing
1798 deaths
Karl Josef